Prostanthera schultzii is a species of flowering plant in the family Lamiaceae and is endemic to the Northern Territory. It is a shrub with heart-shaped to round or paddle-shaped leaves and white flowers with purple spots and yellow patches on the lower lip.

Description
Flowering occurs in April and July and from September to November.

Taxonomy
Prostanthera schultzii was first formally described in 1896 by Ralph Tate from an unpublished description by Ferdinand von Mueller and the description was published in Report on the work of the Horn Scientific Expedition to Central Australia. The type specimens were collected on the "higher slopes of Mount Sonder". In 1976, John Carrick changed the name to Wrixonia schultzii but in 2012 Trevor Wilson, Murray Henwood and Barry Conn changed the name back to P. schultzii.

Distribution and habitat
This mintbush grows in sheltered upper slopes of the Chewings Range in the West MacDonnell National Park of the Northern Territory.

Conservation status
Prostanthera schultzii is classified as "vulnerable" under the Australian Government Environment Protection and Biodiversity Conservation Act 1999 and the Northern Territory Government Territory Parks and Wildlife Conservation Act 1976.

References

schultzii
Flora of the Northern Territory
Lamiales of Australia
Taxa named by Ralph Tate
Plants described in 1896